The Department of Asian Affairs is a department of the Ministry of Foreign Affairs of the People's Republic of China (PRC).

As of 2020,  is the director-general of the department.

See also 

 Department of East Asian and Pacific Affairs of the Ministry of Foreign Affairs (Republic of China)
 ASEAN–China Free Trade Area
 Asian Infrastructure Investment Bank
 Boao Forum for Asia
 East Asia Summit

References

External links 
 Official Foreign Ministry website
 The Department of Asian Affairs 
 The Department of Asian Affairs 

Ministry of Foreign Affairs of the People's Republic of China